The Alternative  Independent Music Gala of Quebec (GAMIQ) is an award-giving event created in 2006. It rewards emerging artists from the Quebec music scene. The awards are granted after the ADISQ awards, and ADISQ award winners are ineligible for GAMIQ awards.

References

External links 
 https://musiqueindependante.com/gamiq/

Quebec music
Organizations based in Quebec
Canadian music awards
Music organizations based in Canada
2006 establishments in Quebec